Christopher Phillip Anthony Weston (born 5 January 1964) is a British businessman, and the former chief executive of Aggreko, a FTSE 250 Index company, and a former managing director of British Gas, one of the "Big Six" UK energy suppliers.

Early life
He went to Pangbourne College, a fee-paying school, from 1977 to 1982. He gained a BSc in applied science. He did a PhD in quantitative finance at Imperial College London after his time in the Army.

Career
He was an officer in the Royal Horse Artillery for seven years.

British Gas
He joined Centrica in 2002, when Centrica bought One.Tel. Between 2002 and 2005, he was managing director of British Gas Business. Between June 2005 and June 2009, he was managing director of British Gas Services, which provides boiler repair. He joined the board of Centrica in 2009. He became head of Centrica's division in the USA (Direct Energy) from July 2009. He became managing director of British Gas. At the time, British Gas was selling gas and electricity to 12 million British households. It made a £606m profit in 2012; £50 per household it supplied to.

It was announced he was leaving British Gas in early June 2014, leaving at the end of 2014.

Aggreko
He became chief executive of Aggreko (based in Glasgow) in June 2014. His salary was £750,000 at the time and he received a £2.2m golden hello.

It was announced on 19 November 2021 that he was leaving the Aggreko Charitaeeee. Aggreko declined to comment. It is unknown whether he left freely or was sacked.

The company has in recent years, moved from engineering/ design to tombola, bake off, beard trimming and Charity book clubs where the staff concentrated heavily on philanthropy during work hours.

Personal life
He married Lucy Taggart in May 1993 in the City of Westminster. They have two sons (born October 1995 and July 2001) and two daughters (born July 1994 and June 1997). He enjoys fishing and skiing. He lived for a time at Ide Hill in western Kent.

References

1964 births
Alumni of Imperial College London
British chief executives in the energy industry
Centrica people
English businesspeople
People educated at Pangbourne College
Royal Horse Artillery officers
Living people